The 2018 Copa Paulino Alcantara was the first edition of the Copa Paulino Alcantara, the domestic football cup competition of the Philippines. The competition started on September 1, 2018 and concluded on October 27, 2018, with Kaya–Iloilo winning the inaugural tournament after defeating Davao Aguilas 1–0 in extra time.

The winners qualified for the 2019 AFC Cup.

Participating clubs
All six clubs of the 2018 Philippines Football League are eligible to participate in the tournament. On July 15, 2018 during the PFL Fans Day, it was announced that non-franchise clubs will also be allowed to join the cup competition provided that they will satisfy minimum licensing requirements which will be set for the competition. But only clubs in the PFL joined the tournament.

Format

Competition
The Copa Paulino Alcantara commenced on September 1, 2018 with a group phase of two groups with three teams each. A round robin format with home and away legs was used for this phase. The top two teams advance to the semifinals with the group winners facing the runner-up team from the other group. The higher seeded teams hosted the one-off semifinals. The final consisted of a single match as well.

Draw
A draw to determine the composition of the groupings for the group phase was held on August 26, 2018.

Group stage

Group A

Group B

Knock-out stage

Bracket

Semi-finals

Final

Top scorers

Notes
 a  Match was moved from the Rizal Memorial Stadium in Manila to Biñan Football Stadium in Biñan to anticipated bad weather due to Typhoon Mangkhut (Ompong).
 b  Davao Aguilas by topping their group were given the right to play their semifinal match at home but due to the unavailability of their home stadium at the Davao del Norte Sports Complex in Tagum, the club opted to play their semifinal match at the Rizal Memorial Stadium in Manila.

References

2018
2018 PFL Cup
2018 domestic association football cups
Copa Paulino Alcantara
Copa Paulino Alcantara